Mike Speck is a Gospel musician and ordained minister from Lebanon, Tennessee. Together with his wife, Faye, and daughter Melody VanNus, Speck tours with a Gospel music trio called the Mike Speck Trio. Speck has performed as a guest artist in ministries with Dr. Charles Stanley, Dr. Bailey Smith, Freddie Gage, and David Ring.

Speck served as minister of music from 2000 to 2001 at Thomas Road Baptist Church in Lynchburg, Virginia. He was also the choir director for the Southern Baptist Convention in 1988. Speck served as Minister of Worship at First Baptist Church of Indian Trail in North Carolina before leaving in 2016.

Speck and his wife also arrange music for church choirs, publishing their work through Lillenas Music. Nine of their choral collections have been nominated for Dove Awards. Speck's most recent collaboration with recording artist/pianist Stan Whitmire, Everlasting Praise 4, was nominated and won the 2014 Dove Award for Best Choral Collection.

External links
Mike Speck Ministries
Mike Speck Music

American performers of Christian music
Southern gospel performers
Living people
Year of birth missing (living people)